Makaoo 120 is an Indian reserve of the Onion Lake Cree Nation in Alberta and Saskatchewan, located between the County of Vermilion River and the Rural Municipality of Frenchman Butte No. 501. It is 42 kilometres north of Lloydminster. In the 2016 Canadian Census, it recorded a population of 726 living in 165 of its 179 total private dwellings.

References

Indian reserves in Alberta
Indian reserves in Saskatchewan